Dysan was an American storage media manufacturing corporation, formed in 1973 in San Jose, California, by CEO and former president C. Norman Dion of San Jose, California. It was instrumental in the development of the 5.25" floppy disk, which appeared in 1976.

History 
In 1983, Jerry Pournelle reported in BYTE that a software-publisher friend of his "distributes all his software on Dysan disks. It costs more to begin with, but saves [the cost of replacing defective media] in the long run, or so he says". By that year Dysan was a Fortune 500 company, had over 1200 employees, and was ranked as among the top ten private sector employers within the Silicon Valley by the San Jose Mercury News, in terms of number of employees. In addition, some of Dysan's administrative and disk production facilities, located within the company's Santa Clara, California, manufacturing campus, were regarded as architecturally remarkable. For example, some of Dysan's Santa Clara campus magnetic media manufacturing facilities included architectural features such as large indoor employee lounge atriums, incorporating glass encased ceilings and walls, live indoor lush landscaping, waterfalls, running water creeks, and ponds with live fish.

In addition to manufacturing floppies, tape drives and hard disks, Dysan also produced hardware and storage containers for the disks.

Dysan merged with Xidex Magnetics in the spring of 1984. In 1997, under the direction of Jerry Ticerelli, Xidex declared bankruptcy. Xidex was absorbed by Anacomp and later spun off as a wholly owned subsidiary as Dysan.

After a brief re-opening in 2003, the company closed six months later under the direction of Dylan Campbell.

Recycling service 
It is possible that Dysan was one of the first tech-based companies to offer a service for recycling used products.  Some Dysan packaging included the following label:

References

Computer storage companies
Defunct computer hardware companies
1973 establishments in California
1984 disestablishments in California
Manufacturing companies established in 1973
Manufacturing companies disestablished in 1984
Companies based in San Jose, California